Herve II of Léon was the son of Herve I, Lord of Léon, the founding member of the Lordship of Léon.

Life 

After his father's death, he became Lord of Léon. His fief was the castle of La Roche-Maurice.

First Marriage and Issue
He married Anne of Hennebont, heiress of part of the Kemenet-Héboé, that is to say two thirds of the old castle of Hennebont, the parishes of Inzinzac and Penquesten, most of Saint-Caradec and Caudan, half of Groix, one third of Plouay, Tréfaven en Ploemeur and several enclaves scattered in Arzano, Gestel and Lesbin, Quéven and Lanvaudan.

Herve II and Anne had a son:
 Harvey III, Lord of Léon (died in 1240).

Second Marriage
After Anne's death, he married a daughter of Morvan, Viscount of Le Faou.

Death
According to the necrology of the Abbaye Saint-Guénolé de Landévennec, Herve II died on 23 November in an unspecified year around 1218, while he was on his way back from the Fifth Crusade.

References

Sources 
Chaillou, Léa. The House of Léon: Genealogy and Origins. Foundations: The Journal of the Foundation for Medieval Genealogy, volume 11, 2019, pp. 19–48 
 Patrick Kernévez et Frédéric Morvan Généalogie des Hervé de Léon (vers 1180-1363). Bulletin de la Société archéologique du Finistère, 2002, p. 279-312.

Lordship of Léon
People from Finistère
1218 deaths
12th-century Breton people
13th-century Breton people